Henri Marie Gabriel Blondeau (5 August 1841 – 4 May 1925)  was a French playwright, librettist and chansonnier, famous for his song Frou-frou.

Biography 

A clerk by a stockbroker, he became known in the early 1860s by his ditties in the cafés-concerts. With his friend Hector Monréal, they would collaborate during 40 years on the stages. 

His plays were presented on the most significant Parisian stages of the 19th century including the Théâtre de l'Ambigu-Comique, Théâtre des Folies-Dramatiques, Théâtre des Variétés, Théâtre du Château d'Eau.  

In 1870, during the Paris Commune, and in association with Monréal, he ran a satirical newspaper called the Fils du Père Duchêne illustré.

Works 

 Ah ! J'aime bien mieux ça !, chansonnette, music by Ernest Martin, 1863
 L'Embarras du choix !, chansonnette, music by Martin, 1863
 Victoire et félicité !, duo comique, music by Auguste Girin, 1863
 Avez-vous vu Lambert ?, scie parisienne, 1864
 Chacun a sa monomanie !, chansonnette, music by Henri Chulliot de Ploosen, 1864
 Comme on change en vieillissant !, chansonnette de genre, 1864
 Impossible de s'en passer !, chansonnette, music by Martin, 1864
 Locataire et portier !, duo comique, music by Martin, 1864
 La Belle Ziguezon, ronde historiette, lyrics and music by Blondeau and Monréal, 1865
 Mr de Richenerac basconnade, chansonnette, with Monréal, 1865
 Ça n'coûte que deux sous ! grrrrande revue du moment déroulée tous les soirs par Heudebert au Café-concert du boulevard du Temple, 1865
 Le Pion amoureux, pochade-parody, mingled with couplets, 1866
 Tapez-moi là-d'ssus !, revue in 4 acts and 8 tableaux, including 1 prologue, with Monréal, 1867
 Ah ! qu'c'est bête, ronde burlesque et populaire, music by Léopold Bougnol, 1868
 Les Hannetons de l'année, revue in 3 acts and 8 tableaux, including a prologue, with Monréal, 1868
 Dagobert et son vélocipède, opérette bouffe in 1 act, 1869
 V'là les bêtises qui recommencent, revue in 4 acts and 8 tableaux, with Monréal, 1869
 Qui veut voir la lune ?, revue fantaisie in 3 acts and 8 tableaux, with Monréal, 1871
 Paris dans l'eau, vaudeville aquatique in 4 acts, with Monréal, 1872
 Une poignée de bêtises, revue in 2 acts and 3 tableaux, with Monréal, 1872
 La Veuve Malbrough, operetta in 1 act, with Monréal, 1872
 La Nuit des noces de la Fille Angot, vaudeville in 1 act, with Monréal, 1873
 Les Pommes d'or, operetta féerie in 3 acts and 12 tableaux, with Chivot, Alfred Duru and Monréal, 1873
 La Comète à Paris, revue in 3 acts and 10 tableaux, with Hector Monréal, 1874
 Ah ! C'est donc toi Mme la Revue !, revue in 3 acts and 10 tableaux, with Monréal, 1874
 Pif-Paf, féerie in 5 acts, including 1 prologue and 20 tableaux, with Clairville and Monréal, 1875
 La Revue à la vapeur, actualité parisienne in 1 act and 3 tableaux, with Paul Siraudin, Charles Blondelet and Monréal, 1875
 L'Ami Fritz-Poulet, parodie à la fourchette, mêlée de chansons à boire et à manger, en deux services, deux entremets et un dessert, with Monréal, 1876
 A treize ! tout à treize !, chansonnette, 1876
 Les Environs de Paris, voyage d'agrément in 4 acts and 8 tableaux, with Monréal, 1877
 Un Hanneton dans la coupole, fantaisie Charentonesque, music by Marc Chautagne, 1877
 Le Pays des chimères. Dalloz, song, music by Chautagne, 1877
 Une Nuit de noces, folie-vaudeville in 1 act, with Monréal, 1883
 Carnot, military drame in 5 acts and 8 tableaux, with Léon Jonathan, 1884
 Au Clair de la lune, revue in 4 acts and 8 tableaux, with Monréal and Georges Grisier, 1884
 Pêle-mêle gazette, revue in 4 acts and 7 tableaux, with Grisier et Monréal, 1885
 La Serinette de Jeannot, vaudeville in 1 act, with Monréal, 1885
 Les Terreurs de Jarnicoton, vaudeville-pantomime in 1 act, with Monréal, 1885
 Les Victimes du devoir !, chanson dramatique, music by Félicien Vargues, 1885
 Paris en général, revue in 4 acts and 10 tableaux, with Grisier and Monréal, 1886
 Mam'zelle Clochette, vaudeville in 1 act, with Monréal, 1887
 La Petite Francillon, little parody in 1 small prologue, 3 small acts and 2 short intermissions, with Alphonse Lemonnier and Monréal, 1887
 Paris-cancans, revue in 3 acts and 8 tableaux, with Monréal, 1888
 Paris Exposition, revue in 3 acts, 9 tableaux, with Monréal, 1889
 Paris-boulevard, revue in 3 acts, 8 tableaux, with Monréal, 1889
 Paris port de mer, revue in 3 acts, 7 tableaux, with Monréal, 1891
 Les Variétés de l'année, revue in 3 acts and 9 tableaux, with Monréal, 1892
 Les Bicyclistes en voyage, play in 3 acts and 7 tableaux, with Henri Chivot, 1893
 Les Rouengaines de l'année, revue in 3 acts, 7 tableaux including a prologue, with Monréal, 1893
 Tout Paris en revue, revue in 3 acts and 3 tableaux, with Monréal, 1894
 La Revue sans gêne, revue in 3 acts, 9 tableaux, with Monréal and Alfred Delilia, 1894
 Vive Robinson !, duo, with Monréal and Delilia, music by Lucien Collin, 1894
 Une semaine à Paris, revue in 3 acts, 11 tableaux, with Monréal, 1896
 Paris qui marche, revue in 3 acts, 10 tableaux, with Monréal, 1897
 Paris sur scène, revue in 3 acts, 8 tableaux, with Monréal, 1897
 Folies-Revue, revue in 3 acts, 9 tableaux, with Monréal, 1898
 Frou-frou, song, with Monréal, 1898
 Madame Méphisto, extravaganza play, in 2 acts and 5 tableaux, with Monréal, 1900
 Paris-joujoux, revue in 2 acts and 6 tableaux, with Monréal, 1901
 Olympia-Revue, in 4 tableaux, with Monréal, 1903
 On demande une étoile, scènes de la vie de théâtre, with Monréal, 1904
 Le Paradis de Mahomet, operetta in 3 acts, music by Robert Planquette, 1906
 Guignol s'en va-t-en guerre, pochade in 3 tableaux and one prologue, with Victor Buteaux, 1915
 Gaspard à Paris, revue d'un permissionnaire in 2 acts and 6 tableaux, with René Pourrière, 1917
 Monsieur Bouchenlarge, fantaisie, undated
 Pour les distraire, dittie, undated

Bibliography 
 Pierre Larousse, Nouveau Larousse illustré, supplément 1898 et 1906, (p. 81)
 Jean Bergeaud, Je choisis ... mon théâtre: Encyclopédie du théâtre, 1956, (p. 104)

External links 
 Voir sa fiche sur Artlyriquefr.fr
 La chanson Frou-frou on Youtube

19th-century French dramatists and playwrights
French librettists
French chansonniers
Writers from Paris
1841 births
1925 deaths